Michael Sharpe is a British psychiatrist and academic, specialising in the psychiatric aspects of medical illness. He is Professor of Psychological Medicine at the University of Oxford and a Fellow of Saint Cross College, Oxford. From 1997 to 2011, he was Professor of Psychological Medicine at the University of Edinburgh.

Honours
In 2009, he was named Psychiatric Academic of the Year by the Royal College of Psychiatrists. In 2014, he was named Psychiatrist of the Year by the Royal College of Psychiatrists.

References

Living people
British psychiatrists
Statutory Professors of the University of Oxford
Fellows of St Cross College, Oxford
Academics of the University of Edinburgh
Year of birth missing (living people)